Loxanthera is a monotypic genus of flowering plants belonging to the family Loranthaceae. The only species is Loxanthera speciosa.

Its native range is Western Malesia.

References

Loranthaceae
Loranthaceae genera
Monotypic Santalales genera